Paul Nicholas Johnston (born 5 January 1948) is a Scottish politician who was a Conservative Member of the Scottish Parliament (MSP) for the Mid Scotland and Fife region from May 1999 until August 2001.

Political career
He stood as a Conservative & Unionist candidate for the Scottish Parliament in 1999 and was elected for the Mid Scotland and Fife region. At the beginning of Parliament, Johnston took the oath in Catalan. In January 2001 he wrote a letter to The Times, where he expressed disillusionment with the attitude of other politicians. An absence from Parliament began in February 2001 with an episode of pneumonia. Johnston resigned in August 2001, citing disillusionment with politics and his perception of a weak party leadership as reasons for doing so.

His place in the Scottish Parliament was taken by Murdo Fraser.

Johnston was among a group of former MSPs who supported Scottish independence, saying that it would give Scotland an opportunity to "create a fairer, more equal society".

Notes

References

External links 
 
 They Work For You
 Retiring in 2001 - Daily Telegraph

1948 births
Living people
People from Filey
Members of the Scottish Parliament 1999–2003
Conservative MSPs
Graduates of the Royal Military Academy Sandhurst